Shooting at the 2020 Summer Paralympics was held at the Asaka Shooting Range.

The 2020 Summer Olympic and Paralympic Games were postponed to 2021 due to the COVID-19 pandemic. They kept the 2020 name and were held from 24 August to 5 September 2021.

Qualification

Medal table

Medalists

Men

Women

Mixed

See also
Shooting at the 2020 Summer Olympics

References

External links
Results book 

2020 Summer Paralympics events
2020
2020
Paralympics
Shooting at the 2020 Summer Paralympics